Ayadi Hamrouni (born 24 December 1971) is a Tunisian footballer. He played in 33 matches for the Tunisia national football team from 1992 to 1999. He was also named in Tunisia's squad for the 1994 African Cup of Nations tournament.

References

1971 births
Living people
Tunisian footballers
Tunisia international footballers
1994 African Cup of Nations players
Place of birth missing (living people)
Association football forwards